Pseudischnocampa triphylia is a moth of the family Erebidae. It was described by Herbert Druce in 1896. It is found in Panama.

References

Phaegopterina
Moths described in 1896